This is a list of individual aircraft which are notable in their own right.

References

Individual aircraft
Lists of aircraft